Charles Anderson Wolverton (October 24, 1880 – May 16, 1969) was a Republican Party politician who represented New Jersey's 1st congressional district in the United States House of Representatives for nearly 32 years, from 1927 to 1959.

Career
After receiving a law degree from the University of Pennsylvania in 1900, Wolverton practiced law in his native Camden, New Jersey. He was Camden County prosecutor from 1906 to 1913 and special assistant attorney general of New Jersey in 1913 and 1914.

Wolverton was then elected to the New Jersey State House of Assembly (1915–1918) becoming speaker in 1918. Wolverton first ran for a Congressional seat in 1926, winning that election and eventually serving 16 terms as a representative.

Wolverton eventually became chairman of the influential Interstate and Foreign Commerce Committee. During his tenure in the US House Wolverton crossed the aisle, voting for a number of FDR's New Deal programs. In 1933 he voted for the National Industrial Recovery Act. In 1935 he voted for the Social Security Act. In 1947-8, he served on the Herter Committee.   Wolverton voted in favor of the Civil Rights Act of 1957.

A resident of Merchantville, New Jersey, Wolverton retired from political office in 1958 to resume his legal practice.

Death
Charles A. Wolverton died at age 88 and was interred in Harleigh Cemetery in Camden.

References

External links

Charles A. Wolverton

Charles A. Wolverton from The Political Graveyard

1880 births
1969 deaths
Republican Party members of the New Jersey General Assembly
Speakers of the New Jersey General Assembly
New Jersey lawyers
People from Merchantville, New Jersey
Politicians from Camden, New Jersey
University of Pennsylvania Law School alumni
Burials at Harleigh Cemetery, Camden
Republican Party members of the United States House of Representatives from New Jersey
20th-century American politicians
20th-century American lawyers